Donald Greenfield MacDonell (July 2, 1849 – November 12, 1916) was a lawyer and political figure in Ontario, Canada. He represented Lanark North in the House of Commons of Canada from 1880 to 1882 as a Liberal member.

He was born in Morrisburg, Canada West, the son of A.G. MacDonell and the grandson of Donald Macdonell of Greenfield. He was educated at Upper Canada College in Toronto. MacDonell was married twice: to Margaret Rosamond in 1875 and to Edith Rose in 1880. He served as reeve of Almonte in 1878. MacDonell was first elected to the House of Commons in an 1880 by-election held after the death of Daniel Galbraith. He was unsuccessful in bids for reelection in 1882 and 1887.

References 
 
The Canadian parliamentary companion and annual register, 1881 CH Mackintosh

1849 births
1916 deaths
Members of the House of Commons of Canada from Ontario
Liberal Party of Canada MPs
People from Almonte, Ontario
Mayors of places in Ontario
People from the United Counties of Stormont, Dundas and Glengarry